The Hilton Orlando Lake Buena Vista is a hotel located adjacent to the Disney Springs complex located on Walt Disney World Resort property in Lake Buena Vista, Florida. The  hotel, which opened on November 23, 1983, is among seven hotels that make up the Disney Springs Resort Area.  The Disney Springs Resort Area Hotels are located on the property of the Walt Disney World Resort in Lake Buena Vista, Florida, but are not operated by Disney.

The hotel houses 787 standard guest rooms (605 with double-double beds) and 27 suites.  Many guest rooms overlook Disney Springs.

The Hilton is primarily a business/convention hotel and has  of meeting/banquet space, a landscaped outdoor pool area, a fitness center, game room, several shops and seven restaurants.

Every year this hotel hosts the Florida DECA State Career Development Conference.

The hotel is the site for regular training by the tax and audit firm KPMG.

The Hilton Orlando Lake Buena Vista was owned by Tishman Hotel Corporation, however, it is managed by the Hilton Hotels Corporation.

Renovation
The Hilton completed a major overhaul in 2001 but has made significant upgrades since, including replacing the carpeting within its interior corridors, upgrading the Executive Towers Lounge and rooms, overhauling and replacing several restaurants and adding to its convention/banquet space by building an addition across from the pool.

Gallery

References

External links

 

1983 establishments in Florida
Orlando Lake Buena Vista
Hotel buildings completed in 1983
Hotels established in 1983
Hotels in Walt Disney World Resort